"Come Clean" is a 1993 song by Jeru the Damaja from his 1994 debut album The Sun Rises in the East. The song appeared in many compilation albums.

The song was featured prominently in the film Morris From America, and season 3, episode 6 of Narcos.

Charts

Personnel
Design - Peace Pype
Engineer - Eddie Sancho
Engineer [Assistant] - Louis Tineo
Executive Producer - DJ Premier, Guru
Mastered By - Howie Weinberg
Other [A&R Coordination] - Dino Delvaille
Photography - Chi Modu
Producer - DJ Premier
Written-By - C. Martin, F. Scruggs, K.J. Davis, K. Jones, C. Parker, T. Taylor

External links
 [ "Come Clean"] at AllMusic

1993 songs
1993 debut singles
FFRR Records singles
Jeru the Damaja songs
Song recordings produced by DJ Premier
Songs written by Jeru the Damaja
Songs written by DJ Premier